Ladislav Toman (13 July 1934 – 10 July 2018) was a Czech volleyball player who competed for Czechoslovakia in the 1964 Summer Olympics. He was born in Prague. In 1964 he was part of the Czechoslovak team which won the silver medal in the Olympic tournament. He played seven matches.

Honours
Czechoslovakia
 European Volleyball Championship (1): 1958
 Summer Olympics runner-up: 1964
 FIVB World Championship runner-up: 1960, 1962

References

External links
 profile

1934 births
2018 deaths
Czech men's volleyball players
Czechoslovak men's volleyball players
Olympic volleyball players of Czechoslovakia
Volleyball players at the 1964 Summer Olympics
Olympic silver medalists for Czechoslovakia
Olympic medalists in volleyball
Medalists at the 1964 Summer Olympics
Sportspeople from Prague